José Florencio Guzmán Correa (22 June 1929, Santiago, Chile – 16 September 2017) was a Chilean lawyer and politician who served as Minister of National Defense from 1 August 1998 until 22 June 1999.

References

1929 births
2017 deaths
Chilean Ministers of Defense
Ambassadors of Chile to Argentina
Government ministers of Chile
Pontifical Catholic University of Chile alumni
Christian Democratic Party (Chile) politicians
Politicians from Santiago